"Hotel Holidays in the Sun" is the second live DVD released by Yui. It was released on March 9, 2011 and contains footage of the final performance in her "Holidays in the Sun" tour. First press edition of the DVD comes with a special sleeve case design and a photobook.

Track listing
Again
Rolling Star
It's All Too Much
Laugh Away
Parade
Cinnamon
Please Stay With Me
How Crazy
Love is All
Tokyo
I'll be
Never Say Die
Es.car
I Do It
Tonight
Shake My Heart
Encore songs
To Mother
Driving Happy Life
Rain
Che.r.ry
Gloria
Good-bye Days

Sales Chart (Japan)

References 

Yui (singer) albums